is a Japanese football player.

International career
On 23 July 2015, Japan's coach Vahid Halilhodžić called him for the upcoming 2015 EAFF East Asian Cup. During this tournament, he scored two goals and became the top scorer.

International goals
Scores and results list Japan's goal tally first.

Club statistics
Updated to 5 November 2022.

1Includes Japanese Super Cup, J. League Championship and FIFA Club World Cup.

National team statistics

Honours

Club
Urawa Red Diamonds
AFC Champions League: 2017
J. League Cup: 2016
Emperor's Cup: 2018

References

External links

 

 
 Profile at Urawa Red Diamonds

1988 births
Living people
Ryutsu Keizai University alumni
People from Zama, Kanagawa
Association football people from Kanagawa Prefecture
Japanese footballers
Japan international footballers
J1 League players
Vegalta Sendai players
Urawa Red Diamonds players
Kashiwa Reysol players
Association football forwards